New Zealand Māori can refer to:

 Māori people
 Māori culture
 Māori language
 New Zealand Māori rugby union team
 New Zealand Māori rugby league team
 New Zealand Māori cricket team

Language and nationality disambiguation pages